The Adirondack Red Wings were a minor professional ice hockey team in the American Hockey League. They played in Glens Falls, New York, United States at the Glens Falls Civic Center. The team was affiliated with the Detroit Red Wings of the National Hockey League.

History

Desirous of promoting a winning atmosphere, Detroit ensured that the Adirondack Red Wings would have, for a minor league franchise, an unusually stable, veteran-laden roster.  Veterans such as Glenn Merkosky, Jody Gage, Greg Joly, Norm Maracle and Dennis Polonich bolstered a team that saw over thirty players have 200 or more games with the franchise, including nine with over 300 and two (Merkosky and Joly) with over 400.  In consequence, the Red Wings missed the playoffs only once in their twenty-year history. They played for the Calder Cup four times, winning each time.

The Red Wings' uniforms were identical to the parent club, with the white jersey featuring the distinctive red sleeves that the Detroit franchise has worn since 1956.  During their final two seasons, the Adirondack Red Wings also wore a third jersey, based on Detroit's throwback design from 1991–92, replacing the word "DETROIT" on the front of the jersey with the winged wheel logo.

The Red Wings prospered as Detroit's top affiliate. However, by the late 1990s, the parent club wanted to move the affiliation closer to Detroit in order to ease movement of players between the minors and the NHL. In early 1999, the Detroit Red Wings announced plans to move the team to Rossford, Ohio—a Toledo suburb—for the 2000–01 season. The Red Wings later suspended operations of the team following the 1998–99 season. As part of the agreement to relocate the franchise, the city of Rossford was to build a $48 million entertainment complex that included a 12,000-seat arena. However, the arena deal fell apart in late 2000. The franchise remained dormant until 2002, when it was purchased by the ownership of the National Basketball Association's San Antonio Spurs and resurrected as the San Antonio Rampage.

The franchise was replaced by:
 Adirondack IceHawks/Frostbite of the UHL (1999–2006).
 Adirondack Phantoms of the AHL (2009–2014).
 Adirondack Flames of the AHL (2014–2015).
 Adirondack Thunder of the ECHL (2015–present).

Coaches
Bill Purcell 1979–1980 
Wayne Maxner 1980–1981
Doug McKay 1981–1982
Bill Mahoney 1982–1983
Bill Dineen 1983–1989
Barry Melrose 1989–1992
Newell Brown 1992–1997
Glenn Merkosky 1997–1999

General managers
Ned Harkness 1979–1982
Jim Devellano 1982–1985
Neil Smith 1985–1989
Bill Dineen 1989–1990
Barry Melrose 1990–1992
Doug MacLean 1992–1994
Ken Holland 1995–1997
Don Waddell 1997–1999

Season-by-season results
 Tidewater Wings 1971–1972
 Virginia Wings 1972–1975
 Adirondack Red Wings 1979–1999

Regular season

Playoffs

† Two game combined total goals series in preliminary round.

Notable alumni

Team records
Career goals: Glenn Merkosky: 204
Career assists: Glenn Merkosky: 212
Career points: Glenn Merkosky: 416
Career penalty minutes: Gord Kruppke: 1,028 
Career games: Glenn Merkosky: 430

References

External links
The Internet Hockey Database - Adirondack Red Wings

 
Sports clubs disestablished in 1999
Ice hockey clubs established in 1979
Ice hockey teams in New York (state)
1979 establishments in New York (state)
1999 disestablishments in New York (state)
Sports in Glens Falls, New York
Detroit Red Wings minor league affiliates
Tampa Bay Lightning minor league affiliates